The 2009–10 UMass Minutemen basketball team represented the University of Massachusetts Amherst during the 2009–10 NCAA Division I men's basketball season. The Minutemen were led by second year head coach Derek Kellogg and played their home games at William D. Mullins Memorial Center. They were members of the Atlantic 10 Conference. They finished the season 12–20, 5–11 in A-10 play to finish in 11th place. The Minutemen lost to Richmond in the A-10 tournament.

Roster

Source

Schedule

|-
!colspan=9 style=| Exhibition

|-
!colspan=9 style=| Regular season

|-
!colspan=9 style=|Atlantic 10 tournament

References

UMass Minutemen basketball seasons
UMass
UMass Minutemen
UMass Minutemen